Patrick James McCarthy is an Irish judge who has served as a Judge of the Court of Appeal since July 2018. He previously served as a Judge of the High Court from 2007 to 2018.

McCarthy obtained a BCL degree from University College Cork and attended the King's Inns. He became a barrister in 1982 and became a senior counsel in 2000. His practice was focused on the Cork circuit. He frequently acted as prosecuting counsel for the Director of Public Prosecutions in criminal trials. He was also a member of the bars of England, Wales and Northern Ireland. He was appointed to the Criminal Law Codification Advisory Committee in 2006, to advise on codification of Irish criminal law.

He was appointed to the High Court in May 2007, where he was assigned to the Central Criminal Court. During his term he was critical of proposed government changes to the selection of judicial appointments.

McCarthy became a Judge of the Court of Appeal in July 2018. His appointment was to fill the vacancy on the court left by Judge  Alan Mahon.

References 

Living people
Alumni of University College Cork
High Court judges (Ireland)
Place of birth missing (living people)
Judges of the Court of Appeal (Ireland)
Alumni of King's Inns
1952 births